Murattu Kaalai may refer to:

 Murattu Kaalai (1980 film), a Tamil-language film directed by S.P.Muthuraman
 Murattu Kaalai (2012 film), a Tamil-language film directed by Selvabharathy